The members of the National Assembly of Zambia from 2021 until 2026 were elected in the 2021 Zambian general election.

Leadership

Members

References 

2021-2026
Zambia